Melangyna novaezelandiae (commonly referred to as the "large hoverfly") is a hoverfly endemic to New Zealand. It is a generalized pollinator of a large range of plants that are both native and exotic to the New Zealand flora. M. novaezelandiae is widespread throughout New Zealand, including in agricultural environments. The larvae of this species feeds on other arthropods and may have uses as a biocontrol agent.

Taxonomy
This species was first described in 1849 as Syrphus ortas by F. Walker. It was described again in 1855 by Pierre-Justin-Marie Macquart as Syrphus novaezelandiae. In 1875, it was described yet again as Syrphus rectus by M. S. Nowicki. In 1969, it was transferred from the genus Syrphus to Melangyna, and placed in the newly erected subgenus Austrosyrphus. It is sometimes referred to as Melangyna novaezealandiae although this name is a less frequently used misspelling of the name in the original species description. In 2008, Christian Thompson recognized M. novaezelandiae, S. ortas, and S. rectus as being the same species (synonyms). Although the species name should traditionally have gone to ortas, the oldest name, he chose to make novaezelandiae the recognized species since it was in widespread use.

The name Syrphus rectus has also been used for a North American species, the yellow-legged flower fly, named by Osten Sacken in 1875.

Description

Most of the body of Melangyna novaezelandiae is coloured metallic black with a green yellow tint. The eyes are a dark reddish-brown colour. There are also six cream coloured bands arranged into three rows on the abdomen. The body has curly hairs scattered throughout the body which are thought to collect pollen. The body has a length of about 7–10.4mm. Males and females are mostly identical, but can be distinguished by whether the eyes are touching dorsally (male) or not (female). The hoverfly forages with rapid movements followed by stationary periods.

Adult M. novaezelandiae are usually only seen from spring to autumn (the warmer months in the southern hemisphere). Egg production is thought to also occur from spring to autumn. The eggs of the flies are laid in close proximity to aphid colonies, which the larvae feed on once they hatch.

Distribution and habitat
Melangyna novaezelandiae is widespread throughout New Zealand and can even be found as far as the Chatham Islands.M. novaezelandiae can be found in a wide range of habitats including subalpine zones and agricultural habitats. In the agricultural areas of New Zealand, M. novaezelandiae is one of the two most common species of hoverfly present (the other species is Melanostoma fasciatum).

Diet
The larvae of Melangyna novaezelandiae are predators that often feeds on aphids, but have also been observed feeding on other arthropods such as scale insects and moth larvae (particularly Pieris rapae and Plutella xylostella). Because of this diet, the larvae have been considered for use as biocontrol agents in New Zealand to manage aphids and other pests that damage crops in agricultural habitats. In contrast to the diet of the larvae, the adults of M. novaezelandiae are herbivorous and feed on pollen to develop their reproductive systems, and on nectar for energy, which may make them a useful pollinator. A previous study that linked gut fullness with egg production has suggested that this finding provides evidence for pollen being used in reproductive system development. It has also been noted that females tend to feed on pollen more frequently than males since the female reproductive system is more costly to develop. Studies of the gut contents of M. novaezelandiae found that pollen grain sizes varied from 19μm to 47μm. Due to these differences in diet at various stages of their life cycle, M. novaezelandiae may be described as having "life history omnivory".

Pollination
Melangyna novaezelandiae are known to be frequent pollinators in both agricultural and natural settings, including subalpine zones. Like many syrphids, M. novaezelandiae is a very generalized pollinator and will visit many species of flower. Observations have noted that the fly will walk between flowers if they are closely clustered together, but will take flight if they are spread apart. In one study of pollination in subalpine zones, it was found that M. novaezelandiae visited more species of flower than any other pollinator observed in that study. In agricultural areas it was found that M. novaezelandiae was the second most common visitor of crop flowers, so may have an important role in pollination. A study about the pollination of bok choy crops in New Zealand investigated the effectiveness of M. novaezelandiae and several other species as a pollinator for these crops. The finding of this study is that M. novaezelandiae had very low effectiveness (they transferred very little pollen between flowers) when compared to that of typical pollinators such as bumblebees and honey bees, which is likely to be attributed to its lack of specialization. These findings are similar to those of similar studies of this hoverfly.

One study found that M. novaezelandiae are most attracted to yellow colours, which may be an important cue in finding floral resources.

A small selection of species of flower that M. novaezelandiae is known to visit includes Trifolium pratense, Raoulia grandiflora, Leptospermum scoparium, Celmisia spectabilis and Melicytus species.

Biogeography
Although there appears to be no research into the origin of this species, one study has suggested that Melangyna novaezelandiae likely evolved after dispersing over from Australia (which has other species of Melangyna, including M. viridiceps and M. damastor).

References

Syrphinae
Syrphini
Diptera of New Zealand
Endemic fauna of New Zealand
Insects described in 1855
Taxa named by Pierre-Justin-Marie Macquart
Endemic insects of New Zealand